Amer Eriksson-Ibragic (born 6 October 1994) is a Swedish football defender who plays for Oskarshamns AIK.

Club career
On 14 February 2022, Eriksson joined Oskarshamns AIK.

References

1994 births
Living people
Swedish footballers
Association football defenders
Jönköpings Södra IF players
Husqvarna FF players
Mjällby AIF players
Assyriska IK players
Oskarshamns AIK players
Ettan Fotboll players
Superettan players
Allsvenskan players